The Mike Oldfield EP is a four themed EP by Mike Oldfield. It was only released in Germany during Oldfield's "World Tour/Who's Next Tour" in 1982. It was also released under the title The Mike Oldfield Group.

Track listing 
 "Mistake" (Mike Oldfield) – 2:55
 "(Waldberg) The Peak" (Oldfield) – 3:24
 "Family Man" (Oldfield, Tim Cross, Rick Fenn, Mike Frye, Maggie Reilly, Morris Pert) – 3:45
 "Mount Teide" (Oldfield) – 4:10

References 

Mike Oldfield albums
1982 EPs
Virgin Records EPs